Albertina Fredrika "Ika" Peyron, née Asp (1 July 1845 in Timrå, Västernorrland – 15 March 1922 in Stockholm) was a Swedish composer, pianist and organist. She wrote songs as well as compositions for violin, piano and solo songs. Her collected works consists of about 40 compositions.

Ika Peyron was the foster child of the merchant Anton Asp, who wished for her to have a profession and gave her a good education. Asp wished for her to become a medical doctor, but she was early on focused on music. She was educated as a pianist in Stockholm and a student of Louise Engström, Ivar Hallström, Johan van Boom, Emil Sjögren and Anton Andersen. She attempted to compose but gave up because of the poor attitude toward female composers. In 1865 she married the merchant and politician Ludvig Peyron, and devoted the next decade to raising her sons. In the late 1870s, her sons were no longer small, and the attitude toward female composers had changed. Ika Peyron devoted herself completely to composition from the 1880s, when she tutored as well as directed and performed concerts at the chapels of the theatres and at the Ladies' Society Nya Idun.

Further reading

References 
Albertina Fredrika (Ika) Peyron, född Asp, in Svenskt porträttgalleri 
Ika Peyron, presentation at Sveriges orkesterförbund 
Biographical article in Idun 1897 
 

1854 births
1922 deaths
19th-century classical composers
20th-century classical composers
Swedish classical composers
Swedish classical organists
Swedish classical pianists
Swedish women pianists
Swedish pianists
Women classical composers
19th-century classical pianists
Women organists
Swedish women composers
19th-century Swedish musicians
Women classical pianists
19th-century Swedish women musicians
20th-century women composers
19th-century women composers
20th-century Swedish women
19th-century women pianists
20th-century women pianists